The Epistle to the Ephesians is the tenth book of the New Testament. According to its text, the letter was written by Paul the Apostle, an attribution that Christians traditionally accepted. However, starting in 1792, some scholars have claimed the letter is actually Deutero-Pauline, meaning that it is pseudepigrapha written in Paul's name by a later author strongly influenced by Paul's thought. According to one scholarly source, the letter was probably written "by a loyal disciple to sum up Paul's teaching and to apply it to a new situation fifteen to twenty-five years after the Apostle's death".

Themes
According to New Testament scholar Daniel Wallace, the theme may be stated pragmatically as "Christians, get along with each other! Maintain the unity practically which Christ has effected positionally by his death."

Another major theme in Ephesians is the keeping of Christ's body (that is, the Church) pure and holy. 

In the second part of the letter, Ephesians 4:17–6:20, the author gives practical advice in how to live a holy, pure, and Christ-inspired lifestyle.

Composition
According to tradition, the Apostle Paul wrote the letter while he was in prison in Rome (around AD 62). This would be about the same time as the Epistle to the Colossians (which in many points it resembles) and the Epistle to Philemon. However, many critical scholars have questioned the authorship of the letter and suggest that it may have been written between AD 80 and 100.

Authorship

The first verse in the letter identifies Paul as its author. While early lists of New Testament books, including the Muratorian fragment and possibly Marcion's canon (if it is to be equated with the Epistle to the Laodiceans), attribute the letter to Paul, more recently there have been challenges to Pauline authorship on the basis of the letter's characteristically non-Pauline syntax, terminology, and eschatology.

Biblical scholar Harold Hoehner, surveying 279 commentaries written between 1519 and 2001, found that 54% favored Pauline authorship, 39% concluded against Pauline authorship and 7% remained uncertain. Norman Perrin and  Dennis C. Duling found that of six authoritative scholarly references, "four of the six decide for pseudonymity, and the other two (Peake's Commentary on the Bible and the Jerome Biblical Commentary) recognize the difficulties in maintaining Pauline authorship. Indeed, the difficulties are insurmountable." Bible scholar Raymond E. Brown asserts that about 80% of critical scholarship judges that Paul did not write Ephesians.

There are four main theories in biblical scholarship that address the question of Pauline authorship.
 The traditional view that the epistle is written by Paul is supported by scholars that include Ezra Abbot, Ragnar Asting, Markus Barth, F. F. Bruce, A. Robert, and André Feuillet, Gaugler, Grant, Harnack, Haupt, Fenton John Anthony Hort, Klijn, Johann David Michaelis, A. Van Roon, Sanders, Schille, Klyne Snodgrass, John R. W. Stott, Frank Thielman, Daniel B. Wallace, Brooke Foss Westcott, and Theodor Zahn. For a defense of the Pauline authorship of  Ephesians, see Ephesians: An Exegetical Commentary, Harold Hoehner, pp 2–61.
 A second position suggests that Ephesians was dictated by Paul with interpolations from another author. Some of the scholars that espouse this view include Albertz, Benoit, Cerfaux, Goguel, Harrison, H. J. Holtzmann, Murphy-O'Connor, and Wagenführer.
 A third group thinks it improbable that Paul authored Ephesians. Among this group are Allan, Beare, Brandon, Rudolf Bultmann, Conzelmann, Dibelius, Goodspeed, Kilsemann, J. Knox, W.L. Knox, Kümmel, K and S Lake, Marxsen, Masson, Mitton, Moffatt, Nineham, Pokorny, Schweizer, and J. Weiss.
 Still other scholars suggest there is a lack of conclusive evidence. Some of this group are Cadbury, Julicher, McNeile, and Williams.

Place, date, and purpose of the writing of the letter
While most English translations indicate that the letter was addressed to "the saints who are in Ephesus" (1:1), the words "in Ephesus" do not appear in the best and earliest manuscripts of the letter, leading most textual critics, like Bart Ehrman, to regard the words as an interpolation. This lack of any internal references to Ephesus in the early manuscripts may have led Marcion, a second-century heresiarch who created the first New Testament canon, to believe that the letter was actually addressed to the church at Laodicea. For details see Epistle to the Laodiceans.

Furthermore, if Paul is regarded as the author, the impersonal character of the letter, which lacks personal greetings or any indication that the author has personal knowledge of his recipients, is incongruous with the account in Acts of Paul staying more than two years in Ephesus. For these reasons, most regard Ephesians to be a circular letter intended for many churches. The Jerusalem Bible notes that some critics think the words "who are" would have been followed by a blank to be filled in with the name of "whichever church was being sent the letter".

If Paul was the author of the letter, then it was probably written from Rome during Paul's first imprisonment, and probably soon after his arrival there in the year 62, four years after he had parted with the Ephesian elders at Miletus. However, scholars who dispute Paul's authorship date the letter to between 70 and 80 AD. In the latter case, the possible location of the authorship could have been within the church of Ephesus itself. Ignatius of Antioch seemed to be very well versed in the epistle to the Ephesians, and mirrors many of his own thoughts in his own epistle to the Ephesians.

Outline

Ephesians contains:
 1:1,2. The greeting, from Paul to the church of Ephesus.
 1:3–2:10. A general account of the blessings that the gospel reveals. This includes the source of these blessings, the means by which they are attained, the reason why they are given, and their final result. The whole of the section Ephesians 1:3–23 consists in the original Greek of just two lengthy and complex sentences. It ends with a fervent prayer for the further spiritual enrichment of the Ephesians.
 Ephesians 2:11-3:21 A description of the change in the spiritual position of Gentiles as a result of the work of Christ. It ends with an account of how Paul was selected and qualified to be an apostle to the Gentiles, in the hope that this will keep them from being dispirited and lead him to pray for them.
 Ephesians 4:1-16. A chapter on unity in the midst of the diversity of gifts among believers.
 Ephesians 4:17-6:9. Instructions about ordinary life and different relationships.
 Ephesians 6:10-24. The imagery of spiritual warfare (including the metaphor of the Armor of God), the mission of Tychicus, and valedictory blessings.

Founding of the church at Ephesus

Paul's first and hurried visit for the space of three months to Ephesus is recorded in Acts 18:19–21. The work he began on this occasion was carried forward by Apollos and Aquila and Priscilla. On his second visit early in the following year, he remained at Ephesus "three years", for he found it was the key to the western provinces of Asia Minor. Here "a great door and effectual" was opened to him, and the church was established and strengthened by his diligent labours there. From Ephesus the gospel spread abroad "almost throughout all Asia." The word "mightily grew and prevailed" despite all the opposition and persecution he encountered.

On his last journey to Jerusalem, the apostle landed at Miletus and, summoning together the elders of the church from Ephesus, delivered to them a farewell charge, expecting to see them no more.

The following parallels between this epistle and the Milesian charge may be traced:

 Acts 20:19 = Ephesians 4:2. The phrase "lowliness of mind".
 Acts 20:27 = Ephesians 1:11. The word "counsel", denoting the divine plan.
 Acts 20:32 = Ephesians 3:20. The divine ability.
 Acts 20:32 = Ephesians 2:20. The building upon the foundation.
 Acts 20:32 = Ephesians 1:14,18 "The inheritance of the saints."

Purpose
The purpose of the epistle, and to whom it was written, are matters of much speculation. It was regarded by C.H. Dodd as the "crown of Paulinism." In general, it is born out of its particular socio-historical context and the situational context of both the author and the audience. Originating in the circumstance of a multicultural church (primarily Jewish and Hellenistic), the author addressed issues appropriate to the diverse religious and cultural backgrounds present in the community.

The author exhorts the church repeatedly to embrace a specific view of salvation, which he then explicates.

Frank Charles Thompson  argues that the main theme of Ephesians is in response to the newly converted Jews who often separated themselves from their Gentile brethren. The unity of the church, especially between Jew and Gentile believers, is the keynote of the book.

Interpretations
Ephesians is notable for its domestic code treatment in Ephesians 5:22–6:9, covering husband-wife, parent-child, and master-slave relationships. In Ephesians 5:22, wives are urged to submit to their husbands, and husbands to love their wives "as Christ loved the Church." Christian Egalitarian theologians, such as Katharine Bushnell and Jessie Penn-Lewis, interpret these commands in the context of the preceding verse, for all Christians to "submit to one another." Thus, it is two-way, mutual submission of both husbands to wives and wives to husbands. But according to Peter O'Brien, Professor Emeritus at Moore Theological College, this would be the only instance of this meaning of submission in the whole New Testament, indeed in any extant comparable Greek texts; by O'Brien's account, the word simply does not connote mutuality. Dallas Theological Seminary professor Daniel Wallace understands it to be an extension of Ephesians 5:15-21 on being filled by the Holy Spirit.

In the period leading up to the American Civil War (1861–65), Ephesians 6:5 on master-slave relationships was one of the Bible verses used by Confederate slaveholders in support of a slaveholding position.

See also
 Earlier Epistle to the Ephesians
 Textual variants in the Epistle to the Ephesians

Notes

References

External links

 A Brief Introduction to Ephesians
 Ephesians Online Reading Room – extensive collection of online resources for Ephesians; Tyndale Seminary
 Biblical Expository on Ephesians
 Ephesians: The Calling of the Saints – Ephesians Messages, Audio & Podcast by Ray Stedman
  Various versions
 

 
1st-century Christian texts
Ephesians
Pauline epistles
Prison writings
Ephesians